Brabantine Gothic, occasionally called Brabantian Gothic, is a significant variant of Gothic architecture that is typical for the Low Countries. It surfaced in the first half of the 14th century at St. Rumbold's Cathedral in the City of Mechelen.<ref
 name=SRK></ref><ref
 name=TIB_1></ref><ref
 group="Note" name=PBL>The earliest Brabantine Gothic style elements were built soon after 1333 when the Prince-Bishop of Liège passed his feudal claim on Mechelen, in particular through its cathedral chapter, to Louis II, Count of Flanders, who married the heiress of Brabant and in 1355 took the title of Duke of Brabant.</ref><ref
 name=Mbs></ref>

Reputed architects such as Jean d'Oisy,<ref
 name=JdO></ref>
Jacob van Thienen,<ref
 name=JvT></ref>
Everaert Spoorwater,<ref
 name=Spoorwater> (This architect is also known as Evert van der Weyden.)</ref>
Matheus de Layens,<ref
 name=deLayens></ref>
and the Keldermans and De Waghemakere<ref
 name=DeWaghemakere></ref>
families disseminated the style and techniques to cities and towns of the Duchy of Brabant and beyond.<ref
 group="Note" name=N_naming>About Gothic architecture in the Low Countries, the Dutch-language term kustgotiek ('Coastal Gothic') occurs. Apparently, that literature describes its present-day national coastal areas: in the Netherlands mainly the subject found in this WP article under Counties of Holland and of Zeeland; in Belgium (including topics about Zeelandic Flanders) mainly (a variant of) Scheldt Gothic.Mostly fifteenth-century constructions, Gothic churches in the former Duchy of Guelders are Lower Rhine Gothic, following a style from the area along the Lower Rhine in present-day Germany.</ref>
For churches and other major buildings, the tenor prevailed and lasted throughout the Renaissance.<ref
 name=Ren></ref>

Harbingers
Brabantine Gothic, in a Low Countries context also referred to as High Gothic, differs from the earlier introduced Scheldt Gothic, which typically had the main tower above the crossing of a church, maintained Romanesque horizontal lines, and applied blue-gray stone quarried from the vicinity of Tournai at the river Scheldt that allowed its transportation in particular in the old County of Flanders.<ref
 name=Scheldt></ref><ref
 name=Dohmen></ref>

Mosan Gothic (Meuse Gothic) refers to the river Maas (or Meuse, borrowed from French), mainly in the south-eastern parts of the Low Countries: the modern provinces of Limburg in the Netherlands, Limburg, and Liège in Belgium. Though of a later origin than Scheldt Gothic, it also still showed more Romanesque features, including smaller windows. Marlstone was used, and around the capitals on limestone columns are sculptured leaves of irises.<ref
 name=Cammaerts></ref>

Characteristics

Two centuries of Brabantine Gothic design
Surface conditions and available materials varied. Larger churches could take centuries of building during which expertise and fashions caused successive architects to evolve further from the original plans. Or, Romanesque churches became rebuilt in phases of dismantling and replacing, as (apart from its crypt) St. Bavo's Cathedral in Ghent: the early 14th-century chancel is influenced by northern French and Scheldt Gothic, a century later a radiating chapel appeared, and between 1462 and 1538 the mature Brabantine Gothic west tower was erected; the nave was then still to be finished.
Though few buildings are of an entirely consistent style, the ingenuity and craftsmanship of architects could realize a harmonious blend. The ultimate concepts were drawn centuries after the earliest designs. It follows that Brabantine Gothic style is neither homogeneous, nor strictly defined.<ref
 group="Note" name=N_elements> Because in many cases, a building shows characteristics of several styles, it may be more accurate to use predicates like 'Gothic' for elements instead of for the entire building. Nevertheless, it is customary to categorize a building by its mainly perceived style, or occasionally by its most noteworthy features. A Gothic building may have been constructed or rebuilt well after the typical period. E.g., apart from one gallery and the ground floor by Rombout II Keldermans, the edifice designed as seat of the Great Council of the Netherlands at Mechelen finally got built following his drawings in the early 20th century, and became a 'new' wing of the City Hall.</ref><ref
 name=CH2-M></ref>

Features
The Brabantine Gothic style originated with the advent of the Duchy of Brabant and spread across the Burgundian Netherlands. Besides minor influences by the High Cathedral of St. Peter and St. Mary in Cologne, the architecture builds on the classic French Gothic style as practiced in the construction of cathedrals such as those in Amiens and Reims.

The structure of the church buildings in Brabant was largely the same: a large-scale cruciform floor plan with three-tier elevation along the nave and side aisles (pier arches, triforium, clerestory) and a choir backed by a half-round ambulatory. The slender tallness of the French naves however, was never surpassed, and the size tended to be slightly more modest.

It is characterized by using light-coloured sandstone or limestone, which allowed rich detailing but is erosion-prone. The churches typically have round columns with cabbage foliage sculpted capitals. From there half-pillar buttresses  continue often without interruption into the vault ribs. The triforium and the windows of the clerestory generally continue into one another, with the windows taking the entire space of the pointed arch. An ambulatory with radiating chapels (chevet) is part of the design (though at the 15th-century choir in Breda added later on). Whereas the cathedrals in Brussels and Antwerp are notable exceptions, the main porch is straight under the single west tower, in French called clocher-porche.

An alternative type originated with the cathedral of Antwerp: instead of round columns with a capital impost, bundled pillars profiled in the columns continue without interruption through the ribs of vaults and arches – a style followed for churches in 's-Hertogenbosch and Leuven. In addition, the pier arches between nave and aisles are exceptionally wide, and the triforium is omitted. Instead, a transom of tracery is placed above the pier arches. This type was followed by other major churches in Antwerp, St. Martin Church in Aalst, and St. Michael's Church in Ghent.

Demer Gothic in the Hageland and Campine Gothic are regional variants of Brabantine Gothic in the south-eastern part of the former duchy.<ref
 group="Note" name=Hage>The Duchy of Brabant included the area around the city of Halen, a western tip of the present-day circumscription of the Province of Limburg of the Flemish Region.</ref>
Those styles can be distinguished merely by the use of local rust-brown bricks.<ref
 group="Note" name=Camp-tower>Sources mention the west tower's sturdiness as a typical Campine Gothic characteristic. Other sources however, note this feature for Brabantine Gothic as a whole.</ref><ref
 name=Camp-NB>

</ref>

Brabantine Gothic city halls are built in the shape of gigantic box reliquaries with corner turrets and usually a belfry. The exterior is often profusely decorated.

Adaptations in Holland and of Zeeland
Many churches in the former Counties of Holland and of Zeeland are built in a style sometimes inaccurately separated as Hollandic and as Zeelandic Gothic. These are in fact Brabantine Gothic style buildings with concessions necessitated by local conditions. Thus (except for Dordrecht), because of the soggy ground, weight was saved by wooden barrel vaults instead of stone vaults and the flying buttresses required for those. In most cases, the walls were made of bricks but cut natural stone was not unusual.

Everaert Spoorwater played an important role in spreading Brabantine Gothic into Holland and Zeeland. He perfected a method by which the drawings for large constructions allowed ordering virtually all natural stone elements from quarries on later Belgian territory, then at the destination needing merely their cementing in place. This eliminated storage near the construction site, and the work could be done without the permanent presence of the architect.

Renowned examples of Brabantine Gothic architecture

In the former Duchy of Brabant

Ecclesiastical buildings
In order of the year mentioned for their earliest Brabantine Gothic style characteristics
St. Rumbold's Cathedral in Mechelen, early Gothic building started around 1200 and consecrated 1312, its first clearly Brabantine Gothic features: ambulatory and 7 radiant chapels from 1335, possibly by Jean d'Oisy
Church of Our Lady in Aarschot, from 1337 by Jacob Piccart
St. Martin's Basilica in Halle, from 1341 possibly by Jean d'Oisy
Collegiate Church of St. Peter and St. Guido in Anderlecht (Brussels), from 1350
Cathedral of Our Lady in Antwerp, from 1352
Church of Our Lady-at-the-Pool in Tienen, from 1358 by Jean d'Oisy
St. John's Cathedral in 's-Hertogenbosch, from about 1370, considered the height of Brabantine Gothic in the present-day Netherlands
St. Gummarus' Church in Lier, from 1378; the design of the choir is an imitation of that of St. Rumbold's at Mechelen.
Church of Our Lady-across-the-Dijle in Mechelen, from before 1400<ref
 name=OLVodD></ref>
St. Peter's Church in Leuven, from about 1400
St. Sulpicius and St. Denis Collegiate Church (colloq. St. Sulpicius Church) in Diest, from before 1402 start for a radiating chapel by the Frenchman Pierre de Savoye - Demer Gothic<ref
 name=SSSD-D_1>At Diest, between 1312 and 1321 the building project for the choir started by the Frenchman Pierre de Savoye, but no source indicates anything then to have been (the very earliest anywhere) Brabantine Gothic style. One source specifies that 2 columns became erected by (some time between) 1330 and 1340, and that the first of the radiating chapels (a Brabantine characteristic) also 'dates from this first period' (without specifying its end date); it starts the next phase in 1402. Another source states that around 1400 Hendrik van Thienen became de Savoye's successor and then built the first of the southern radiating chapels, and that in 1432 Sulpitus van Vorst completed the (earlier) begun northern radiating chapel:

</ref>
St. Bavo's Cathedral in Ghent, from early 15th century
Large Church or Church of Our Lady in Breda, from 1410, considered the most pure and elegant Brabantine Gothic in the present-day Netherlands
Cathedral of St. Michael and St. Gudula in Brussels
Church of Our Blessed Lady of the Sablon in Brussels
St. Martin's Church in Aalst
Gertrudiskerk in Bergen op Zoom

Secular buildings
Brussels' Town Hall
Leuven's Town Hall
Margraves' Palace (Dutch: Markiezenhof) in Bergen op Zoom
Mechelen's Town Hall, north wing (in 1526 designed and partially built, 1900-1911 partially rebuilt and fully completed)<ref
 group="Note" name=N_elements />
Oirschot's former Town Hall<ref
 name=TIB_2></ref> (Brick building that also housed the Vierschaar, in a minor town: characteristic shrine shape but extremely sober)
Round Table (Dutch: Tafelrond) in Leuven, 1479 by Matheus de Layens, guildhall built 1480-1487 internally comprising 3 houses, demolished 1817, reconstructed following original plans 1921

In the former Counties of Holland and of Zeeland

Ecclesiastical buildings
Large Church or Church of Our Lady in Dordrecht (Holland), the present form dates from 1470.
Large Church or Grote or Sint-Laurenskerk (Alkmaar) in Alkmaar (Holland)
Large Church or St. Grote of Sint-Laurenskerk (Rotterdam) in Rotterdam (Holland)
Large Church or Grote Kerk, Haarlem in Haarlem (Holland)
Highland Church or St. Pancras' Church in Leiden (Holland)
St Willibrordus, Hulst in Hulst<ref
 name=HC-L></ref>
Old Church, formerly St. Nicolas' Church, in Amsterdam (largest medieval wooden barrel vault in Europe; wooden spire)<ref
 group="Note" name=N_OK-A>The 'Old Church' in Amsterdam is built with bricks. It shares clear Gothic features with its old hall church character.</ref>
St. Livinus' Monster Tower (Dutch: St.-Lievensmonstertoren) in Zierikzee (Zeeland) (separated by a gap from the meanwhile demolished church building)<ref
 name=Monster1></ref><ref
 group="Note" name=N_gap>In Mechelen, the very heavy St.Rumbold's tower (now 97 metres high but designed to reach 167, which is 5 metres more than any church tower attains) was being built on earlier wetlands. After a few years, in 1454, its chief architect Andries I Keldermans construed the tower at Zierikzee, where dreaded leaning or sagging of the tower (now 62 metres but designed for ca. 130) could wreck the church. This concern led to fully separated edifices, a solution as applied in Mechelen. At both places, in the early 16th century the upper part of the tower became forsaken, not for technical but for financial reasons. The gap with the cathedral was closed upon finishing the construction. That deliberately weak connection had not been made in Zierikzee when the collegiate church burned down, in 1832.</ref>

Secular buildings
Gouda's Town Hall (Holland)
Middelburg's Town Hall (Zeeland)

Elsewhere

Ecclesiastical buildings

St. Martin's Cathedral in Ypres, in the former County of Flanders<ref
 name=SMC-Y></ref>
St. Michael's Church in Ghent, in the former County of Flanders
St. Willibrord's Basilica in Hulst, in Zeelandic Flanders: until 1648 in the County of Flanders, currently in the Province of Zeeland in the Netherlands
St. Waltrude Collegiate Church in Mons, in the former County of Hainaut (built with a hard sandstone and blue limestone)
St. Lambert's Church in Nederweert, until 1703 in the Prince-bishopric of Liège (though during a part of the 16th century County of Horn), currently in the Province of Limburg in the Netherlands
St. Martin's Cathedral or Domkerk in Utrecht, between Counties of Brabant and of Holland, and Duchy of Guelders in the Netherlands (Gothic church on an island in the Rhine, possibly directly inspired by the cathedral in Cologne, though it has a single west tower. This tower became a regional model referred to as Utrecht & Sticht Gothic).

Secular buildings
Damme's Town Hall, in the former County of Flanders
Oudenaarde's Town Hall, in the former County of Flanders

Notes

References

Sources
(Note: Several construction dates have become contradicted by more recent sources) 
(On a specialized blog explicitly focusing on the present-day Netherlands, though a few of those described variant styles are prevalent in Belgium.)
(Stone: materials, techniques, and applications - focused on Belgium and south-eastern Netherlands)
(History of Gothic architecture - international, and specific attention for Belgium)
 (Gothic - international, and specific attention for Brabantine Gothic)
(Sober description of Gothic styles in the Low Counties)
(The Reconstruction of Monuments and Sites in Belgium after World War I)

External links
 (1000 years of architectural history in the Netherlands)
 (Site about historical architecture in Brabant, focused on the Netherlands)

Architectural styles
Gothic architecture
Gothic architecture in Belgium
Gothic architecture in the Netherlands
14th-century architecture
15th-century architecture
16th-century architecture